Franco Carrera (born November 8, 1943 in Turin) is a retired Italian professional football player.

1943 births
Living people
Italian footballers
Serie A players
Juventus F.C. players
S.P.A.L. players
Calcio Foggia 1920 players
Catania S.S.D. players
Novara F.C. players
Taranto F.C. 1927 players
Parma Calcio 1913 players
Association football midfielders